In number theory, a rational reciprocity law is a reciprocity law involving residue symbols that are related by a factor of +1 or –1 rather than a general root of unity.

As an example, there are rational biquadratic and octic reciprocity laws.  Define the symbol (x|p)k to be +1 if x is a k-th power modulo the prime p and -1 otherwise.

Let p and q be distinct primes congruent to 1 modulo 4, such that (p|q)2 = (q|p)2 = +1.  Let p = a2 + b2 and q = A2 + B2 with aA odd.  Then

If in addition p and q are congruent to 1 modulo 8, let p = c2 + 2d2 and q = C2 + 2D2.  Then

References

Algebraic number theory